Boss Heavy Metal-2, abbreviated as Boss HM-2, is a guitar distortion pedal manufactured by Boss between 1983 and 1991. Designed to emulate Marshall stacks, it became associated with the Swedish death metal sound, known as "Chainsaw tone" and gained a cult following in the heavy metal scene.

Background and influence
Boss HM-2 was first issued in 1983. It was originally manufactured in Japan and then in Taiwan. It was designed to emulate the mid-range response of the Marshall stacks. According to Michael Astley-Brown of Guitar World, compared to the other distortion pedals, the pedal offered "radically versatile low and high ‘Color Mix’ EQ controls with 20 dB of boost/cut." Despite achieving a moderate success in the glam metal scene, the pedal was discontinued in 1991; it was succeeded by Boss HM-3 Hyper Metal and Boss MT-2 Metal Zone, latter of which became a commercial success. In the 1990s, the pedal attracted a cult following in the underground heavy metal scene due to its formative influence over the Swedish death metal sound. Entombed's 1990 album, Left Hand Path, cemented its use in the scene; the pedal is often used with its settings set to maximum to achieve a "buzz saw" sound. It is often referred to as "Swedish Chainsaw" by its fanbase. 

Many Boss HM-2 especially Made in Japan has been collected by guitarist of Entombed and Dismember.

Since its discontinuance, Boss HM-2 became one of the demanded pedals of the Boss back catalogue. Different manufacturers have produced custom pedal clones to emulate its sound. Guitarist and record producer Kurt Ballou has been cited as an influence for the pedal's resurgence and bands such as Nails and Rotten Sound have also appropriated the pedal's sound for different extreme metal styles. In 2020, Boss Corporation president Yoshi Ikegami announced that the pedal would be reissued as a part of the Waza Craft pedal series under the name Boss HM-2w. For the reissue, the company also established a Facebook group to seek design feedback from the fanbase.

The Waza Craft version added Custom mode to the Boss HM-2w, like Boss MT-2w.

Notable users

Notable users of the pedal include:

 Mika Aalto
 Michael Amott
 Anders Björler
 David Blomqvist
 Justin Broadrick
 The Chemical Brothers (with a Juno-106)
 Uffe Cederlund
 Leif “Leffe” Cuzner
 Ola Englund
 David Gilmour
 G. C. Green
 Alex Hellid
 Todd Jones
 Martin Larsson
 Anders Nyström
 Dan Swanö
 Kurt Ballou
 Bilinda Butcher
 Nocturno Culto 
 James Sedwards

References

External links

Effects units
Boss Corporation
Japanese inventions
Japanese musical instruments
Musical instruments invented in the 1980s
Death metal